Clinton County is a county in the north-easternmost corner of the state of New York, in the United States and bordered by the Canadian province of Quebec. As of the 2020 United States Census, the population was 79,843. Its county seat is the city of Plattsburgh. The county lies just south of the border with the Canadian province of Quebec and to the west of the State of Vermont.

The county is named for George Clinton, the first Governor of New York, who later was elected as Vice President. He had been a Founding Father who represented New York in the Continental Congress.

Clinton County comprises the Plattsburgh, New York Micropolitan statistical area.

History

When counties were established in New York State in 1683, the present Clinton County was part of Albany County. This was an enormous county, including the northern part of New York State as well as all of the present state of Vermont and, in theory, extending westward to the Pacific Ocean. This county was reduced in size on July 3, 1766, by the creation of Cumberland County, and further on March 16, 1770, by the creation of Gloucester County, both containing territory now in Vermont. On March 12, 1772, what was left of Albany County was split into three parts, one remaining under the name Albany County. One of the other pieces, Charlotte County, contained the eastern portion.

In 1784, the name "Charlotte County" was changed to Washington County to honor George Washington, the American Revolutionary War General and later the first President of the United States of America.

In 1788, Clinton County split off from Washington County.

In 1799, Essex County split from Clinton County.

In 1802, parts of Clinton, Herkimer, and Montgomery counties formed the new St. Lawrence County.

In 1808, Franklin County split from Clinton County.

Geography
Clinton County lies at the northeast corner of New York state. Its northern border abuts the Canadian province of Quebec. Its eastern border abuts the state of Vermont (across Lake Champlain). The encompassing region is referred to as the Adirondack Coast.

The Saranac River flows easterly through the central part of the county, discharging into Lake Champlain at Plattsburgh, and the Great Chazy River flows northeastward through the upper part of the county, discharging into Lake Champlain at Coopersville. The Ausable River forms a large part of the southern county line. The county's highest point is Lyon Mountain, in the town of Dannemora, at 3,830' (1167m) ASL.

Adjacent counties and municipalities

 Grand Isle County, Vermont — east
 Chittenden County, Vermont — southeast
 Essex County — south
 Franklin County — west
 Le Haut-Richelieu Regional County Municipality, Quebec — north
 Le Haut-Saint-Laurent Regional County Municipality, Quebec — north
 Les Jardins-de-Napierville Regional County Municipality, Quebec — north

Protected areas

 Adirondack Park (part)
 Ausable Marsh Wildlife Management Area
 Cadyville State Forest
 Chazy Fossil Reef National Natural Landmark (part)
 Dannemora State Forest
 Dunkin's Reserve State Forest
 Flat Rock State Forest
 Kings Bay Wildlife Management Area
 Macomb State Forest
 Miner Lake State Park
 Monty's Bay Wildlife Management Area
 Point au Roche State Park
 Valcour Island
 Valcour Island Primitive Area

Lakes

 Chazy Lake
 Fern Lake
 Lake Champlain (along east border)
 Mead Reservoir
 Military Pond
 Miner Lake
 Mud Pond
 Newberry Pond
 Patterson Reservoir
 Silver Lake
 Slush Pond
 Taylor Pond
 Union Falls Pond (part)
 Upper Chateaugay Lake

Government and politics

|}

Like much of the North Country region, Clinton County has historically been a Republican county. However, it has voted for Democratic candidates at the state and national level in recent times. Since 1996, it has voted for the Democratic candidate for president in every election. In the 2008 U.S. presidential election, Barack Obama carried the county by a 22.9% margin over John McCain (Obama won every municipality in the county), and won by a 26.9% margin over McCain statewide. In 2006, both Eliot Spitzer and Hillary Clinton carried the county, winning 63% and 64% of vote, respectively. In 2010, Governor Andrew Cuomo, and Senators Chuck Schumer and Kirsten Gillibrand won the county, each receiving more than 60% of the vote.

Republicans still win most local races. The county's Congressional district did not elect a Democrat to Congress  until 2009 when Bill Owens defeated Doug Hoffman in the special election to replace John McHugh, who resigned to serve as the Obama Administration's Secretary of the Army. The special election received nationwide attention due to Hoffman, a third-party candidate and Tea Party favorite, polling higher than the Republican nominee, Dede Scozzafava, which ultimately led to her dropping out of the race and supporting Owens. It had not elected a Democrat to the State Senate or State Assembly in over a half-century until Billy Jones was elected to the State Assembly in 2016.

The Clinton County Legislature is the lawmaking body of the county. It consists of 10 members, each elected from single member districts. As of 2021, the County Legislature consists of five Republicans and four Democrats and a vacancy.

Demographics

2020 Census

2000 census
As of the 2000 United States Census, there were 79,894 people, 29,423 households, and 19,272 families in the county. The racial makeup of the county was 93.33% White, 3.58% Black or African American, 0.36% Native American, 0.67% Asian, 0.02% Pacific Islander, 1.10% from other races, and 0.93% from two or more races.  2.46% of the population were Hispanic or Latino of any race. 23.7% were of French, 15.0% French Canadian, 12.5% American, 11.8% Irish, 7.6% English and 5.5% German ancestry according to Census 2000. 94.1% spoke English, 2.8% French and 1.7% Spanish as their first language.

There were 29,423 households, out of which 32.00% had children under the age of 18 living with them, 51.00% were married couples living together, 10.20% had a female householder with no husband present, and 34.50% were non-families. 26.30% of all households were made up of individuals, and 10.00% had someone living alone who was 65 years of age or older.  The average household size was 2.47 and the average family size was 2.98.

The county population contained 23.00% under the age of 18, 12.40% from 18 to 24, 30.60% from 25 to 44, 22.10% from 45 to 64, and 11.90% who were 65 years of age or older. The median age was 36 years. For every 100 females there were 104.90 males. For every 100 females age 18 and over, there were 104.60 males.

The median household income was $37,028, and the median income for a family was $45,732. Males had a median income of $33,788 versus $25,520 for females. The per capita income for the county was $17,946. About 9.40% of families and 13.90% of the population were below the poverty line, including 15.30% of those under age 18 and 11.40% of those age 65 or over.

Education
The State University of New York at Plattsburgh is located in the City of Plattsburgh. The county is also served by Clinton Community College, which is located in the Town of Plattsburgh.

Infrastructure
Clinton Correctional Facility, a maximum-security prison is located in the village of Dannemora. Altona Correctional Facility is a medium-security prison in the town of Altona.

Transportation

Highways

 Interstate 87 - runs N-S, to the Canada–United States border
 US-2
 US-9
 US-11
 NY-3
 NY-9N
 NY-22
 NY-22B
 NY-190
 NY-191
 NY-374
 NY-442
 NY-456

Airports
 Plattsburgh International Airport (PBG) – Plattsburgh
 Clinton County Airport (PLB) – Plattsburgh
 Rouses Point Seaplane Base (K21) – Rouses Point

Rail
Amtrak's Adirondack Train travels through the county, connecting Montreal to New York City. Two trains a day (one north and one south) stop in the county in Plattsburgh and Rouses Point.

Mass-Transit
The Clinton County Public Transit runs bus routes that branch from Plattsburgh to towns in the county.

Communities

Larger settlements

† - County seat

†† - Former village

‡ - Not wholly in this county

Towns

 Altona
 Au Sable
 Beekmantown
 Black Brook
 Champlain
 Chazy
 Clinton
 Dannemora (town)
 Ellenburg
 Mooers
 Peru
 Plattsburgh
 Saranac
 Schuyler Falls

Hamlets
 Churubusco
 Coopersville
 Swastika
 Morrisonville

See also

 Lake Champlain
 Cumberland Head
 SUNY Plattsburgh
 List of counties in New York
 National Register of Historic Places listings in Clinton County, New York

References

Further reading

External links

  Clinton County, NY webpage
 
  Summary early history of Clinton County and its towns
  Clinton County Historical Association Museum

 
1788 establishments in New York (state)
Populated places established in 1788